The George Jewett Trophy is an American college football rivalry trophy that was established in 2021 to be awarded to the winner of the Michigan–Northwestern football game.

History

Establishment of trophy

In 2021, the two universities announced the creation of the George Jewett Trophy to be awarded to the game's winner. The trophy honors Jewett who was the first African-American player at both schools. This marked the first FBS rivalry game trophy named for an African-American player.

George Jewett

Michigan and Northwestern first played on October 29, 1892 in Chicago. In that game, halfback George Jewett, Michigan's first African-American player, kicked a field goal and led Michigan's play on both offense and defense. Despite Jewett's effort, Northwestern prevailed by a 10–8 score.

Jewett transferred to Northwestern in 1893 and became that school's first African-American football player. Jewett scored Northwestern's only touchdown in its 1893 loss to Michigan.

Pre-trophy games
The Wildcats went on to win six out of the first thirteen games, before Michigan began to dominate the series. The two programs were co-champions of the Big Ten during the 1926, 1930, and 1931 seasons. And in 1925, Northwestern halted Michigan's march to a national championship with a 3–2 victory on a muddy surface at Soldier Field. The three points scored by Northwestern were the only points allowed by the 1925 Michigan team that Fielding H. Yost called "the greatest football team I ever saw in action."

In 1948, the schools met with Michigan ranked No. 4 in the AP Poll and Northwestern at No. 3. Michigan forced four turnovers and prevailed by a 28–0 score, as the Wolverines jumped to  No. 1, en route to a national championship.

The Wildcats returned to prominence under head coach Ara Parseghian, defeating the Wolverines in consecutive games in 1958 and 1959. Following Parseghian's departure, the series reached its nadir as Michigan won 19 consecutive games from 1966 to 1992.

In 1995, No. 25 Northwestern scored 10 unanswered points in the fourth quarter to shock No. 6 Michigan, 19–13. The Wildcats took advantage of four Michigan turnovers, and Pat Fitzgerald led Northwestern with 14 tackles including 2 tackles for loss. It was Northwestern's first victory over Michigan in 30 years, and first win in Ann Arbor since 1959. This upset sprung Northwestern on the path to a 10–2 season, reaching as high as No. 3 in the rankings. The Wildcats won their first Big Ten Conference title since 1936, and were invited to play in the Rose Bowl for the first time since 1948.

Additional Northwestern upsets of highly ranked Michigan teams in 1996 and 2000 were key in Northwestern's Big Ten title winning seasons. The 1995, 1996, and 2000 teams are Northwestern's only three Big Ten champions in the AP Poll era.

Prior to the creation of the Jewett Trophy, Michigan held a 58–15–2 advantage in the series.

Game results

Michigan leads the all-time series 59–15–2

See also
 List of NCAA college football rivalry games

References

College football rivalries in the United States
Michigan Wolverines football
Northwestern Wildcats football